Embury is a surname. Notable people with the surname include:

Alexander Thomas Embury (1874–1956), Conservative member of the Canadian House of Commons
Aymar Embury II (1880–1966), American architect
David A. Embury (1886–1960), attorney and author of The Fine Art of Mixing Drinks (1948)
Emma Catherine Embury (1806–1863), American author and poet
Philip Embury (born 1729), Methodist preacher, a leader of one of the earliest Methodist congregations in the United States
Shane Embury (born 1967), British musician
Sheila Embury (1931–2005), former nurse and provincial level politician from Alberta, Canada

See also
Embury Beacon, the site of an Iron Age Hill fort on the West of the Hartland Peninsula in North Devon, England